Sættedammen is a cohousing community in Denmark. Established 1972, it is the world's first cohousing community. The membership comprises approximately 60 adults and 20 children in 35 households. Sættedammen is an open, non-dogmatic community, based on social activities (various interest groups, a daily common dinner, common celebration of holidays and cultural events).

External links
Sættedammen's web site (in Danish)

Housing in Denmark